Gopi Gopika Godavari is a 2009 Indian Telugu-language film released on 10 July 2009. The film, starring  Venu Thottempudi, Kamalinee Mukherjee, Krishna Bhagavan and Sana, was directed by Vamsy.

Plot 
Gopi and Gopika, who have never met each other, fall in love over texting. However, while Gopi loses his memory in an accident, soon after planning to meet Gopika, she saves his life as a stranger.

Cast
 Venu Thottempudi as Gopi
 Kamalinee Mukherjee as Gopika
 Krishna Bhagavan
 Jayalalitha
 Pradeep Shakthi
 Kondavalasa Lakshmana Rao
 Praveen
 Narsing Yadav
 Sana
 Krishneswara Rao

Soundtrack 
Chakri later reused "Nuvvekkadunte" as "Enakkoru Devathai" for Tamil film Pillaiyar Theru Kadaisi Veedu.

References

2009 films
2000s Telugu-language films
Films directed by Vamsy
Films scored by Chakri